Orzeł Kolno is a Polish football club based in Kolno. The club is currently playing in III Liga (4th level).

Achievements 

 one season in Poland III Liga - season 1963/1964
 The Polish Cup on Voivodship area 1980/1981 (regional qualification)

External links 
 Official Orzeł Kolno Site
 Orzeł Kolno at the 90minut.pl website (Polish)

Association football clubs established in 1929
Kolno County
Football clubs in Podlaskie Voivodeship
1929 establishments in Poland